For information on all Mercer University sports, see Mercer Bears

The Mercer Bears baseball program is the intercollegiate baseball team of Mercer University located in Macon, Georgia, United States. The team competes in the NCAA Division I and is a member of the Southern Conference. The Bears are coached by Craig Gibson.

References